Geoffrey William Fleetwood Thompson  (born 11 June 1940) is a former New Zealand politician of the National Party.

Early life
Thompson was born in Wellington on 11 June 1940. He received his education at Waterloo and Silverstream primary schools, Hutt Valley High School, Horowhenua College and Wellington College. He attended Victoria University of Wellington and graduated LL.M. in 1966.

Member of parliament

Thompson represented the Horowhenua electorate in the New Zealand House of Representatives from 1978 to 1984. He was a parliamentary under-secretary between 1981 and 1984.

After parliament
Thompson was awarded the New Zealand 1990 Commemoration Medal for services to New Zealand. He was a lawyer on the Kapiti Coast.

He served as the National Party president from 1994 to 1998.  In the 1999 New Year Honours, he was appointed a Companion of the New Zealand Order of Merit, for services to politics.

Notes

References

Honoured by the Queen-New Zealand: 1953 to 1993 by Alister Taylor (1994, Who's Who Aotearoa, Auckland)

Living people
1940 births
New Zealand National Party MPs
20th-century New Zealand lawyers
Companions of the New Zealand Order of Merit
Members of the New Zealand House of Representatives
New Zealand MPs for North Island electorates
Unsuccessful candidates in the 1984 New Zealand general election
People educated at Hutt Valley High School
People educated at Horowhenua College
People educated at Wellington College (New Zealand)